The drug policy of Germany is considered to be one of the most lenient among EU countries. Policies vary depending on the state.

In 1994, the Federal Constitutional Court ruled that drug addiction and the possession of small quantities of narcotics for personal use were not crimes. In 2000, the German law on narcotics (Betäubungsmittelgesetz) was changed to allow supervised injection rooms.

In 2002, a pilot project was started in seven German cities to evaluate the effects of heroin-assisted treatment on addicts, compared to methadone-assisted treatment. In 2009, the positive results of the study led to heroin-assisted treatment becoming included in mandatory health insurance.

In an international operation that resulted in one arrest, a man from Vlaardingen, Netherlands, German and Belgian authorities seized the largest amount of cocaine in Europe.

Cannabis policy 
In 2017, Germany re-allowed medical cannabis. After the 2021 German federal election, the new government announced in their coalition agreement that they intend to legalise cannabis for all purposes (including recreational), although concrete legislation to this effect has not yet been introduced.

References

See also
Drug policy of the Third Reich
Anti-tobacco movement in Nazi Germany
Drugs controlled by the German Betäubungsmittelgesetz
Drug liberalization#Germany
List of German drug laws

 
German criminal law